Orazio degli Albizzi (1610–1676) was a Roman Catholic prelate who served as Bishop of Volterra (1610–1676).

Biography
Orazio degli Albizzi was born in Florence, Italy in 1610.
On 5 July 1655, he was appointed during the papacy of Pope Alexander VII as Bishop of Volterra.
On 11 July 1655, he was consecrated bishop by Francesco Maria Brancaccio, Bishop of Viterbo e Tuscania. 
He served as Bishop of Volterra until his death on 30 January 1676.

References 

17th-century Italian Roman Catholic bishops
Bishops appointed by Pope Alexander VII
1610 births
1676 deaths